DXML (1044 AM) is a radio station of Rural Electrification Corporation. The station's studio and transmitter are located along MacArthur Hi-way, Digos. In 1981, 6 years after Davao del Sur Electric Cooperative acquired Rural Electrification Corporation, the Associated Labor Unions (ALU) took over the management of the station.

References

Radio stations in Davao City
News and talk radio stations in the Philippines